North Corbin is a census-designated place (CDP) in Laurel and Knox counties in the U.S. state of Kentucky. The population was 1,727 at the 2020 census down from 1,773 at the 2010 census. The census bureau also lists the Laurel County portion of North Corbin as a CCD with a population of 10,729. 

The city of Corbin is located south of North Corbin.

The Harland Sanders Café and Museum, the restaurant where Colonel Sanders developed the fried chicken recipe that would later become famous as Kentucky Fried Chicken, is located in the Laurel County portion of North Corbin.

Geography
North Corbin is located in southern Laurel County at  (36.960433, -84.093867). A small portion extends east into Knox County. It is bordered to the south by the city of Corbin in Whitley County.

Interstate 75 forms the western edge of the North Corbin CDP, with access from Exit 29, U.S. Route 25E, which forms the northern edge of the CDP. US 25E intersects U.S. Route 25W in North Corbin, forming U.S. Route 25, which leaves town to the north and leads  to London, the Laurel county seat. US 25E leads southeast from North Corbin  to Barbourville, the Knox county seat. Larger destinations along I-75 include Lexington  to the north and Knoxville, Tennessee, the same distance to the south.

Lynn Camp Creek forms the southern boundary of the community as well as the Whitley County line. The creek is a west-flowing tributary of the Laurel River and part of the Cumberland River watershed.

Demographics

As of the census of 2000, there were 1,662 people, 689 households, and 469 families residing in the CDP. The racial makeup of the CDP was 97.41% White, 0.06% African American, 0.60% Native American, 0.24% Pacific Islander, 0.06% from other races, and 1.62% from two or more races. Hispanic or Latino of any race were 0.06% of the population.

There were 689 households, out of which 29.6% had children under the age of 18 living with them, 50.9% were married couples living together, 14.2% had a female householder with no husband present, and 31.8% were non-families. 27.6% of all households were made up of individuals, and 10.0% had someone living alone who was 65 years of age or older. The average household size was 2.41 and the average family size was 2.94.

In the CDP, the population was spread out, with 24.8% under the age of 18, 8.0% from 18 to 24, 28.9% from 25 to 44, 26.5% from 45 to 64, and 11.7% who were 65 years of age or older. The median age was 36 years. For every 100 females, there were 87.0 males. For every 100 females age 18 and over, there were 88.4 males.

The median income for a household in the CDP was $25,756, and the median income for a family was $27,389. Males had a median income of $26,912 versus $20,000 for females. The per capita income for the CDP was $11,104. About 26.6% of families and 33.5% of the population were below the poverty line, including 58.2% of those under age 18 and 8.7% of those age 65 or over.

References

Census-designated places in Knox County, Kentucky
Census-designated places in Laurel County, Kentucky
Census-designated places in Kentucky
KFC